is a Japanese manga series written and illustrated by Rino Mizuho about nine-year-old Suguri Kinoshita, who loves animals and making fashion accessories. One day, while buying materials for accessories, Suguri finds an unusual rock which she thinks will look cute on a bracelet. But when she picks it up, she discovers that the rock is a creature named Kappy, the three-year-old prince of Kapimeshia. Happy Kappy was serialized in Shogakukan's Shōgaku Ichinensei and later Pucchigumi magazines. It was adapted into an anime television series under the direction of Takuya Minezawa and began its broadcast run in Japan on April 6, 2011, on TV Tokyo.

Characters 
 Suguri Kinoshita
 

 Kappy

Media

Manga

Anime

Reception

References

External links 
 
 

Anime series
Manga series
2007 manga
Shogakukan manga
Shōjo manga